Satavahana University is a non-profit public university  higher Co-educational institution  situated in Karimnagar, Telangana . Officially recognized by the University Grants Commission of India. The university is named after the Satavahana dynasty.

History 
Satavahana University has its roots in a Post Graduate Centre of Osmania University, established 1976 in Godavarikhani. In 1993 the centre was transferred to the Kakatiya University. The centre was upgraded to university in month of June 2008. It started functioning from its permanent campus in Karimnagar in 2012.

Former vice-Chancellors 
Former vice-chancellors of the institute are:
 Mohd. Iqbal Ali, 2008–2011
 B. Venkat Rathnam, 2011–2012
 K. Veera Reddy 2012–2015
 B. Janardhan Reddy 2015–2017

Colleges
The university has two constituent colleges, the University Post Graduate College, in Godavarikhani and the University College in Karimnagar. It affiliates more than 160 colleges in the Karimnagar district.

Academics
UG Course Intake: Management studies, Education, Computer Science, computer application, Information Technology, Artificial Intelligence, Biotechnology and others.

PG Course Intake: Political Science, Sanskrit, English, Mathematics, Commerce, History, Chemistry, Philosophy, Economics, Others.

See also
 List of universities in India
 List of institutions of higher education in Telangana

References

External links

Karimnagar
2008 establishments in Andhra Pradesh
Educational institutions established in 2008
State universities in Telangana